Borgolavezzaro (Piedmontese: Borghlavzar, Lombard: Burglavsàr) is a comune (municipality) in the Province of Novara in the Italian region Piedmont, located about  northeast of Turin and about  southeast of Novara.

Borgolavezzaro borders the following municipalities: Albonese, Cilavegna, Nicorvo, Robbio, Tornaco, Vespolate.

Borgolavezzaro was founded in 1200.

It was the birthplace of illustrious figures like the war's minister and Alpine group's founder Cesare Magnani Ricotti, the italian writers Luigi Gramegna and Gaudenzio Merula, and Luigi Tornielli, politician and founder of BPN one of the most important bank of northern Italy.

References

External links
 Official website

Cities and towns in Piedmont